The coastline of Australia comprises the coasts of mainland Australia and Tasmania. It nominally includes a part of all Australian states and territories; the otherwise landlocked Australian Capital Territory has a coastal enclave at Jervis Bay Territory.

Due to the historical context of European discovery and exploration, the coastline has been the first point of contact over 400 years.

In the IBRA bioregionalisation, the coast has 36 coastal bioregions that define the whole coast
and there is the more complex Integrated Marine and Coastal Regionalisation of Australia, which includes ecological features that are beyond the shoreline.

History
For thousands of years, Indigenous Australian clan groups along the coastline have preserved a longstanding maritime tradition in connection of sea country, with the conservation of marine life across large areas of Australia.

In the period of the European maritime exploration of Australia, the Australian coastline was discovered by a group of navigators, including Willem Janszoon, Dirk Hartog, Abel Tasman, Captain James Cook and Matthew Flinders, who went on to become the first in leading the first inshore circumnavigation of Australia and charter much of the coast.

The Australian Maritime Safety Authority promotes the protection of the marine environment and the infrastructure of safety for navigation around the coastline, which maintains a national search and maritime rescue services.

Coastline length

See also

 Geography of Australia

References

 
Geography of Australia